Gravity Falls is an American mystery comedy animated television series created by Alex Hirsch for Disney Channel and Disney XD. The series follows the adventures of Dipper Pines (Jason Ritter) and his twin sister Mabel (Kristen Schaal) who are sent to spend the summer with their great-uncle (or "Grunkle") Stan (Hirsch) in Gravity Falls, Oregon, a mysterious town full of paranormal incidents and supernatural creatures. The kids help Stan run the "Mystery Shack", the tourist trap that he owns, while also investigating the local mysteries.

The series premiered on June 15, 2012, and ran until February 15, 2016. On November 20, 2015, Hirsch announced that the series would finish with its second season, stating that this was "100% [his] choice" and that "the show isn't being cancelled – it's being finished" and was simply reaching its natural conclusion. The series ended on February 15, 2016, with a one-hour finale, "Weirdmageddon 3: Take Back The Falls". Hirsch later stated that he remains open to continuing the series with additional episodes or specials.

Gravity Falls received critical acclaim with praise directed at its writing, characters, voice acting, animation, humor, and multi-generational appeal. Additionally, the series won two Emmy Awards, three Annie Awards, and a BAFTA Children's Award, among various other wins and nominations. Gravity Falls garnered high viewership amongst kids, teenagers, and young adults during its run and was Disney XD's highest rated show in 2015 and early 2016, while also setting several ratings records for the network. The series has attracted a broad and passionate fandom and has been considered to be an influence for many animated shows that followed it, and has also spawned a variety of official merchandise.

Premise

For their summer vacation, 12-year-old twins Dipper and Mabel Pines are dropped off from their home in Piedmont, California, to the fictitious town of Gravity Falls, Roadkill County, Oregon, to spend the summer with their great uncle Stan Pines (often shortened to Grunkle Stan), who runs a tourist trap called the "Mystery Shack". Things are not what they seem in this small town, and with the help of a mysterious journal that Dipper finds in the forest, they begin unraveling the town's mysteries. With Wendy Corduroy, Mystery Shack cashier; Soos Ramirez, a friend of Dipper and Mabel and handyman to Grunkle Stan; plus an assortment of other characters, Dipper and Mabel always have an intriguing day to look forward to.

Episodes

Main series

Shorts

Characters

Main characters
 Dipper Pines (voiced by Jason Ritter) – The 12-year-old twin brother of Mabel Pines.
 Mabel Pines (voiced by Kristen Schaal) – The 12-year-old twin sister of Dipper Pines.
 Stanley "Stan" Pines (also known as "Grunkle Stan") (voiced by Alex Hirsch) – The greedy, grumpy, yet loving great-uncle of Dipper and Mabel Pines.
 Soos Ramirez  (voiced by Alex Hirsch) – The 22-year-old handyman at the Mystery Shack.
 Wendy Corduroy (voiced by Linda Cardellini) – A 15-year-old part-time employee at the Mystery Shack, on whom Dipper has a crush.
 Stanford Pines (voiced by J. K. Simmons) – Stan's six-fingered long-lost identical twin brother and the author of the journals.
 Bill Cipher (voiced by Alex Hirsch) – An interdimensional demon that can be summoned and released into a person's mind. He resembles a one-eyed yellow triangle superficially similar to the Eye of Providence that wears a top hat and a bow tie. He serves as the main antagonist of the series.

Production

Conception
[[File:811SonoraAvenue.jpg|thumb|right|Gravity Falls main production offices were located at Disney Television Animation in Glendale, California.]]

Prior to working on the series, series creator Alex Hirsch's primary inspiration growing up was the popular animated sitcom The Simpsons, where he observed that "animation could be funnier than live-action. That animation didn't have to just be for kids. That it could be satirical and observational and grounded in a sense of character interaction". Hirsch graduated from the California Institute of the Arts, and was hired to work as writer and storyboard artist for the Cartoon Network series The Marvelous Misadventures of Flapjack, where he was paired up with Pendleton Ward, the creator of Adventure Time. Afterwards, he moved on to co-develop the Disney Channel animated series Fish Hooks; shortly before he pitched Gravity Falls, which was subsequently green-lit.

Hirsch said he was at the California Institute of the Arts when he turned down DreamWorks Animation executive Jeffrey Katzenberg out of a desire to work for Disney. He first coined the concept for the show in an 11-minute low-budget student film that he made at the institute. Hirsch was called in to do a pitch for Disney Channel for a show based on the short pilot. Disney Channel bought the idea and the series premiered on June 15, 2012.

The series was inspired by Hirsch's own childhood experiences and his relationship with his own twin sister growing up during their summer vacations. He placed many of his real-life experiences in the show, like living in Piedmont and trick-or-treating with his sister as kids. Dipper Pines is based on Hirsch's memory of how it felt to be a kid. When Hirsch was around Dipper's age, he "would record [him]self and play it backwards and try to learn to speak backwards". Hirsch described himself as "that neurotic kid who would carry 16 disposable cameras everywhere I went". Mabel Pines was inspired by his twin sister, Ariel Hirsch. According to Hirsch, just like Mabel, his sister "really did wear wacky sweaters and have a different ridiculous crush, every week." In the series Mabel gets a pet pig, just like his sister had always wanted when she was a kid. Grunkle Stan was inspired by Hirsch's grandpa Stan, who according to Hirsch "was a guy that told tall tales and would frequently mess with us to get a rise out of us. So, my family really inspired the characters on the show."

Writing
In an interview with Oh My Disney, Hirsch claimed he already had the beginning, middle, and end of the story for Gravity Falls planned out when he first pitched the series. He originally thought the series would "be two or three seasons". However, Hirsch had never created a TV series before and after experiencing how "incredibly draining" it was, he initially wanted to end the series after season one and, ultimately, on a cliffhanger. After the series premiered and became a huge commercial success, Hirsch began to rethink his decision. Two people convinced him to return and do a second season: Jon Stewart, the former host of The Daily Show (and eventual Gravity Falls guest star), who told Hirsch that his kids loved the show, and Patrick McHale, who created the animated series Over the Garden Wall. McHale had been watching the series and told him: "Look, after that cliffhanger, you’ve got to finish it." Hirsch decided that he had about ten more episodes left in him, so he went to the network, who said, "We only take seasons in twenties." So he said, "Okay, one more season, … Before we started the [second] season, it said in my contract, before I put pen to paper, that this is my last season." The studio agreed, under the condition that Hirsch could not tell anyone. As a result, Jason Ritter, who voices Dipper, did not know the series was ending until after he read the finale script, claiming that "when I read the finale I thought, this feels like, not just the season finale. It feels like a series finale."

Hirsch explained in an interview with The A.V. Club that during the production of season one, that a typical episode was conceived in a room reserved for writers, where a simple synopsis was presented, and from then on dramatic structure was defined, and the plot was modified to include a character-driven subplot, which Hirsch expressed as "the hardest thing ... to find a character story that actually uncovers, explores, or pushes tension—on something our characters care about—that is properly explored via the magic or monster or impossibility of the week."

B- and A-stories were created and were given to a writer to produce an outline, which was then subsequently checked-off by Hirsch for feedback. The writer produced a draft from these edits, where more notes may have been given. Hirsch stated that he and creative director Mike Rianda may have personally created a draft for themselves before a final script was produced, in which the dialogue from the draft received from the writer was significantly revised; Hirsch stated that the revising process "is not a discredit to our writers—it's just we have a very particular vision. In particular, I usually rewrite almost all of Dipper's dialogue and most of Mabel's dialogue, just because I have them in my head. Me and Mike will stay up for about 24 hours prior to the delivery of every script. We'll take the weekend, we'll work all night, we'll drink Red Bull, we'll sleep on the couch in shifts like maniacs, we'll slap each other in the face."

Animation
After a script was delivered, an episode then got translated into a storyboard, where feedback was received from Hirsch to the board artists if a certain element, such as a gag, did not work. Afterwards, a pitch for the episode was given to the network, where they did a read-through, and then the episode was either checked out by the network, or retooled in the small amount of time allocated before an animation studio must receive something to work with. The series was animated by Rough Draft Korea, Digital eMation and Yearim Productions. However, whenever a sequence was deemed too important for the outside animation studios to realize, it was animated in-house by storyboard artist and supervisor Dana Terrace.

Broadcast

Initial broadcast
The first twelve episodes of Gravity Falls aired in a regular weekly slot on Disney Channel starting in mid-2012, but subsequent episodes were broadcast without similar regularity; it took until August 2013 to broadcast the remaining eight episodes of the first season. The second season began airing a year later in August 2014, transitioning over to Disney XD, but again without any regularity as to when new episodes would be first broadcast. The first nine episodes aired from August to November 2014, the following two in February and March 2015, the next eight from July to November 2015, and the finale aired on February 15, 2016. According to Disney XD, as each episode took about six months of work to complete, they opted against stockpiling episodes to show weekly but instead take advantage of the serial nature of the show, broadcasting each episode as it was completed and making an event out of it. On April 2, 2018, reruns of the show started airing on Disney Channel, although reruns of the show still air on Disney XD.

International broadcast
The series began airing on Disney Channel Canada on September 1, 2015, following Corus Entertainment's acquisition of Disney Channel rights in Canada. In Canada the show began airing on Disney XD starting on December 1, 2015, following the launch of Disney XD. The show started broadcasting in the United Kingdom and Ireland on July 20, 2012, as a preview and officially premiered on September 7, 2012. In Australia and New Zealand it previewed on August 17, 2012, and premiered on September 24, 2012. It also premiered in Southeast Asia on October 27, 2012. In India, it premiered on September 16, 2013. In the Middle East region, the series was previewed on October 19, 2012, and premiered on November 10, 2012.

The series preview debuted in Canada on June 15, 2012, and premiered on July 6, 2012, on Family Channel, until January 2016 when it moved to the local Disney XD channel following Corus Entertainment's acquisition of Disney Channel rights in Canada from Family's owner DHX Media. In Australia, the show airs on Disney XD and 7mate while in Chile, the show was broadcast on Canal 13 on November 24, 2013, under its programming block CuBox. In the Philippines, the show was shown on TV5 beginning on May 4, 2014, while in Brazil, the show also began airing on Rede Globo on May 10, 2014. In Indonesia, the show premiered on RCTI on August 17, 2014.

Broadcast edits
The symbol on Grunkle Stan's fez was changed from a crescent shape resembling the Islamic crescent to a fish-like symbol mid-way through the first season's broadcast. The symbol represents his membership in the Royal Order of the Holy Mackerel. When the series was released to Disney+, the crescent-shaped symbol was edited out entirely, leaving a symbol-less fez in the early episodes—later episodes featuring the fish-like symbol were unaffected. However, the crescent symbol remains in the thumbnails, and on the zodiac wheel in the title sequence. Hirsch drew attention to the change on Twitter. Disney has not commented on why it was removed. Sometime later, the symbol on the fez was restored.

In 2017, Disney Channel redubbed Louis C.K.'s minor role as "The Horrifying Sweaty One-Armed Monstrosity" in the 2015 episode "Weirdmageddon Part 1", as well as its 2016 follow-up episode and series finale, "Weirdmageddon 3: Take Back The Falls", following the comedian's admission of sexual misconduct. Series creator Alex Hirsch is now credited as voicing the character.

Merchandise
Home media

On March 27, 2018, Shout! Factory announced that they would release the complete series as a box set on July 24, 2018, on DVD and Blu-ray Disc. The box set is available in a "Collector's Edition", which includes an exclusive bonus features disc. The complete series has only been released in the United States and Canada.

Books

Video game
A video game was created for the series, titled Gravity Falls: Legend of the Gnome Gemulets. The game was released exclusively on Nintendo 3DS on October 20, 2015. It was developed and published by Ubisoft and produced by Disney Interactive Studios. The game is a platformer and uses the same graphics as the series.

Reception

Critical reception
Both seasons of Gravity Falls hold a 100% approval rating on Rotten Tomatoes. 
On Rotten Tomatoes, season one has an average critic score of 7.40 out of 10 based on 12 reviews. Season two has an average critic score of 8.80 out of 10 based on 8 reviews. The website's critical consensus for season one reads: "Gravity Falls'''  warm humor and bright performances elevate this children's cartoon to a show for all ages", while the website's critical consensus for season two reads: "Gravity Falls continues to blend old fashioned storytelling with a modern sense of humor to create a uniquely enjoyable viewing experience."

Brian Lowry of Variety stated: "The show has a breezy quality that should play to kids, and tickle some twinges of nostalgia among their parents." Robert Lloyd  of the Los Angeles Times referred to the program as "...gently twisted, with some Disneyfied action and heart-warming folded in". In his review, David Hinckley of New York Daily News called Gravity Falls "quirky and endearing", and offered praise for the character of Mabel Pines. Matt Blum, writing for Wired, favorably compared the show to Cartoon Network's Regular Show and Disney Channel's Phineas and Ferb, hailing Gravity Falls as "clever, strange, and somewhat poignant". Erik Kain of Forbes called Gravity Falls "the best thing on TV at the moment," saying "I don't care how old you are, if you're not watching Gravity Falls you're missing out on some of the cleverest, most enjoyable television you can find". Kayla Cobb of Decider called Gravity Falls "one of the most structurally smart shows ever created". Matt Fowler from IGN called Gravity Falls "a quirky and gently twisted heart-warmer for all ages. Smart, satirical, and sweet. Gravity Falls was a one-of-a-kind gem."

Michelle Jaworski writing for The Daily Dot described Gravity Falls as "[A] classic summer story woven into a smart and addictive show tackling the paranormal, the supernatural, and the pains of growing up." IndieWires Michael Schneider said "Gravity Falls is a kids' show so dense with mythology, pop culture jokes, Easter eggs, and mystery that grown-ups were often more invested." Joey Keogh from Den of Geek wrote "Gravity Falls, is a spooky-cute must-watch for adults who never grew out of Halloween." Donna Dickens from Uproxx said "Not only does Gravity Falls deal with the inexplicable supernatural occurrences in the town, the whole thing is just one big puzzle of secrets waiting for fans to uncover and solve." Myles McNutt from The A.V. Club said "With a complex mythology and a deep lexicon of cultural references, there's sophistication to the show's epic storytelling that immediately drew the attention of a wider audience." Liz Baessler writing for Film School Rejects said "Gravity Falls is an exceptional kids' show — brilliant, hilarious, and carefully crafted." Kevin Tash from Collider called Gravity Falls "one of the greatest things that Disney has ever produced in general."

In 2015, Uproxx ranked Gravity Falls as the third Current Kids Cartoon That Adults Need to be Watching. In 2018, IndieWire ranked Gravity Falls at number 12 on their list of The 50 Best Animated Series Of All Time. In 2019, Yardbarker ranked Gravity Falls at number 21 on their list of The 25 Greatest Animated Shows of All Time. Also in 2019, IGN placed Gravity Falls at Number 19 on their list titled The 25 Best Adult Cartoon TV Series and The A.V. Club placed Gravity Falls at number 48 on their list of The 100 Best TV Shows of the 2010s.

Ratings
A special preview of the series following the Disney Channel Original Movie Let It Shine was watched by 3.4 million viewers. The series garnered high viewership on its fifth episode, which aired on July 13, 2012, and attracted 3.6 million viewers. On March 15, 2013, the episode "The Deep End" was watched by 4.5 million viewers after the premiere of Wizards of Waverly Place The Wizards Return: Alex vs. Alex, becoming the highest-rated episode of the series.

Later moving on to Disney XD, the episode "A Tale of Two Stans" became the highest-rated telecast ever on Disney XD, with 1.91 million viewers. In addition to total viewers, "A Tale of Two Stans" also set a network record in kids ages 2–11 (1.036 million), boys ages 2–11 (686,000), boys ages 6–11 (574,000), kids ages 6–14 (1.279 million) and boys ages 6–14 (856,000). In 2015, Gravity Falls accounted for Disney XD's top seven regular animated series telecasts of all time among kids ages 6–11. During the week of July 12–18, 2015, Gravity Falls was the top-rated program in its 8:30 p.m. timeslot across kids and boys ages 2–11, 6–11 and 6–14. That same week, it was also cable TV's number 1 scripted telecast in total viewers, according to estimates from Nielsen Ratings.Gravity Falls ranked as Disney XD's number 1 series of 2015 across all target demographics with an average of 1.8 million viewers per episode. Additionally, Gravity Falls ranked as 2015's third animated cable TV series in boys ages 9–14. In kids ages 6–11, the series averaged 654,000 viewers and 790,000 in kids ages 2–11. Among boys ages 6–14 it pulled in 680,000 views. That is strong viewership in Disney XD's core demographics, but it also makes it clear that older teens and young adults make up more than half of the show's audience according to Variety.

In February 2016, Gravity Falls was the number 1 regular series telecast on record across kids ages 6–11 (1.0 million/4.4 rating), boys ages 6–11 (642,000/5.3 rating), kids ages 2–11 (1.3 million/3.4 rating) and boys ages 2–11 (797,000/4.0 rating). The series finale "Weirdmageddon 3: Take Back The Falls" beat the ratings record previously held by "A Tale of Two Stans" becoming Disney XD's most-watched telecast ever, with 2.47 million viewers in the United States. "Weirdmageddon 3: Take Back The Falls" also established new all-time network highs in kids ages 6–14 (1.5 million/4.1 rating) and boys ages 6–14 (909,000/5.0 rating). The all-day Gravity Falls marathon that preceded the premiere of "Weirdmageddon 3: Take Back The Falls" generated 10.7 million unique total viewers, of which 5.4 million were kids ages 2–14.

 Influence, legacy and industry impact 
 Gravity Falls has been considered to be an influence for many animated shows that followed it, including Steven Universe, Star vs. the Forces of Evil, The Owl House, Amphibia and Rick and Morty. Other examples of the show's influence include LGBT representation and series-long story arcs as opposed to isolated single-episode stories. The show also maintains a loyal and passionate fandom, even years after the series finale. The creator of the show hid a variety of codes, cryptograms, backwards messages, and other secret clues for fans to find in every episode, which often contributed to the show's mysteries and lore. Some have compared Gravity Falls to more adult-oriented mystery shows like Lost, Twin Peaks and The X-Files. While it was on the air, the show was Disney XD's highest rated series, with an average of 1.8 million viewers per episode.

In the summer of 2016, Gravity Falls creator Alex Hirsch threw an international treasure hunt known as the "Cipher Hunt", the goal of which was to find the real-life Bill Cipher statue briefly glimpsed in the series finale. It ran from July 20 to August 3, 2016, and involved retrieving and decoding riddles and codes hidden in various locations worldwide. One clue involved a 2,000-piece jigsaw puzzle that took several days to complete with someone almost always working on it. On August 3, 2016, the statue was found in a forest in Reedsport, Oregon. While the first ones to the statue received various prizes, Hirsch made it clear that the hunt itself was the real treasure. On August 3, the statue was removed by authorities due to a property dispute and was temporarily held at the Reedsport police department while Hirsch arranged for it to be moved somewhere else. By August 5, the statue temporarily ended up in Bicentennial Park in Reedsport, before being permanently relocated to Confusion Hill in Piercy, California a few weeks later.

In celebration of the release of Journal 3 and the end of the Gravity Falls series, Oh My Disney and Cyclops Print Works teamed up with Gallery Nucleus in Alhambra, California to hold an official Gravity Falls art show, titled Farewell to the Falls: A Gravity Falls Art Show, on August 6–21, 2016. Creator Alex Hirsch along with other production staff and professional illustrators contributed new and original artwork to this exhibition. Some fans camped out overnight to see the show and some works of art sold for over $1,000.

On August 8, 2020, Disney Channel aired a Gravity Falls-inspired episode of the show Amphibia titled "Wax Museum". The episode served as a tribute to Gravity Falls and features Alex Hirsch in a voice role.

On September 11, 2020, a short was released on the Disney Channel YouTube channel called "Gravity Falls x Line Rider". The short is based on the Internet game Line Rider. It is the first of a new series of shorts for Disney. Disney partnered with Line Rider artists Mark Robbins, Ben Harvey and David Lu for the series.

On September 25, 2020, a Gravity Falls short was released on the Disney Channel YouTube channel called "Call Me Maybe Parody". In the short, Mabel sings "Call Me Mabel", a parody of Carly Rae Jepsen's "Call Me Maybe". The short was released as a part of a series called "Broken Karaoke" where various Disney characters sing parodies of pop songs.

On October 3, 2021, the television show The Simpsons aired the episode "Bart's in Jail!" which featured a brief cameo of Bill Cipher as one of Loki's many incarnations, voiced by Alex Hirsch in a guest role.

Several former storyboard artists and production crew members who worked on Gravity Falls have gone on to create their own series and movies, including Matt Braly (a former director and storyboard artist who went on to create Amphibia), Dana Terrace (a former storyboard artist who went on to direct on the first season of DuckTales and create The Owl House), Chris Houghton (a former storyboard artist who went on to create Big City Greens with his brother Shane Houghton), Mike Rianda (a former creative director, and writer who went on to make the film The Mitchells vs. the Machines) and Shion Takeuchi (a former writer who went on to create Inside Job).

Awards and nominations

Future
On July 14, 2017, Hirsch revealed that he and Disney had talked about making a Gravity Falls film. Disney ultimately passed on the project, as the studio felt the show "wasn't big enough to warrant [a film]"; Hirsch stated that he was still interested in the idea.

In February 2018, on the second anniversary of the series finale, Hirsch used a cipher to announce Gravity Falls: Lost Legends, a continuation of the Gravity Falls story in a new graphic novel that was later released on July 24, 2018.

In an interview with Inverse in March 2021, Hirsch expressed interest in continuing the story of Gravity Falls'' in the form of a video game that "is really, really in-depth to the lore of the series and includes new canon that has been in the periphery of the series."

Notes

References

External links
 
 
 
 

 
2010s American animated television series
2010s American comedy-drama television series
2010s American mystery television series
2010s American surreal comedy television series
2012 American television series debuts
2016 American television series endings
American children's animated adventure television series
American children's animated comedy television series
American children's animated drama television series
American children's animated fantasy television series
American children's animated mystery television series
Animated television series about children
Animated television series about families
Animated television series about siblings
Animated television series about twins
Annie Award winners
Cryptozoological television series
Disney Channel original programming
Disney XD original programming
English-language television shows
Fiction about secret societies
Fictional populated places in Oregon
Identity theft in popular culture
Oregon culture
Television series about conspiracy theories
Television series about vacationing
Television series by Disney Television Animation
Television series by Rough Draft Studios
Television series created by Alex Hirsch
Television shows set in Oregon